OLIGO Primer Analysis Software was the first publicly available software for DNA primer design. The first papers describing this software were published in 1989 and 1990, and consecutive upgrades in the 1990s and 2000s, all have been cited together over 600 times in scientific journals and over 500 times in patents (according to Scopus). The program is a comprehensive real time PCR primer and probe search and analysis tool, and also does other tasks such as siRNA and molecular beacon searches, open reading frame, restriction enzyme analysis, etc. It has been created and maintained by Wojciech Rychlik and Piotr Rychlik. The OLIGO has been reviewed several times in scientific journals, for the first time in 1991 in a review in Critical Reviews in Biochemistry and Molecular Biology, and for its next upgrades (with OLIGO 7 being the latest one in 2011).

Oligo Primer Analysis Software has been used in various scientific studies (as cited by examples of recent publications), among them for: real time PCR, apoptosis studies, antigen typing, species identification, studies on species evolution,  measuring mRNA expression levels, oligonucleotide-based array hybridization studies, degenerate primer studies, microsatellite analysis, DNA microarray detection, inverse PCR, genome walking, nucleotide polymorphisms studies, detection of microorganisms or viruses, genotyping,  cloning, vector (gene) construction, genome sequencing, detection of mutants or intraspecific variability, genetic disease studies, siRNA and gene silencing, FISH analysis (single cell expression study), scorpion probes, and development of new DNA amplification methods.

References

Oligo Primer Analysis Software by Molecular Biology Insights

Other Primer Design Software 
 FastPCR
 Gene Designer 
 Geneious
 MacVector
 Netprimer
 Primer Premier
 UGENE
 Vector NTI

Bioinformatics software